Yunesky Maya Mendizula (born August 28, 1981) is a Cuban-born professional baseball pitcher for the Diablos Rojos del México of the Mexican Baseball League y actualmente juega con las Águilas Cibaeñas del Cibao en República Dominicana. He has previously pitched for the Washington Nationals of Major League Baseball and Pinar del Río of the Cuban National Series. He was part of the Cuban national baseball team at the 2006 and 2009 World Baseball Classic.

Career

Cuba
Maya led the Cuban National Series with a 1.61 earned run average (ERA) in 2004–05, and followed that up with a 7–9 record and a 3.79 ERA in 2005–06.

In the 2008–2009 Cuban National Series Season Maya finished with a 13–4 record and seven complete games, and finished second amongst League Leaders in ERA with 2.22 ERA. He was also second in Strikeouts with 119, behind Aroldis Chapman who had 130 (after the season, Chapman defected and signed with the Cincinnati Reds). On this performance, Maya won Cuba's equivalent of the Cy Young Award.  During six Cuban National Series seasons, Maya accumulated a record of 48–29 and an ERA of 2.51.

In Summer 2009, Maya was expelled from the Cuban national baseball team; the official newspaper Granma referred to "grave problems of indiscipline", presumably following a failed attempt to leave the country without permission. In September 2009, Maya successfully fled Cuba. After living in the Dominican Republic for about nine months, the United States Department of Treasury authorized Maya to sign with a Major League Baseball team.

Washington Nationals
On July 31, 2010, Maya signed with the Washington Nationals. Maya zoomed through the Nationals minor league system, making only five starts, before getting the call to the majors when rosters expanded in September.  In the minors, he started two games for the GCL Nationals; one game for the Potomac Nationals; and two games for the Syracuse Chiefs, combining for  innings pitched and an overall ERA of 3.38 ERA.  He pitched five inning in his first major league start was on September 7, 2010, against the New York Mets (which also saw the big league debut of Met Dillon Gee).  After a rough start (allowing a three-run homer in the first inning to Ike Davis), he retired 11 of the last 12 batters he faced.

On May 29, 2011, Maya was recalled by the Washington Nationals to take the rotation spot of Tom Gorzelanny, who was placed on the disabled list. Collin Balester was optioned to Triple-A Syracuse to make room. He was designated for assignment on May 25, 2013. However, the Nationals got him back and sent him outright to the Syracuse Chiefs.

Atlanta Braves
On December 11, 2013, Maya signed a minor league contract with the Atlanta Braves. On July 11, 2014, Maya was released by the Braves organization.

Doosan Bears
On July 25, 2014, Maya signed with the Doosan Bears of the Korea Baseball Organization on a one-year, $175,000 contract, replacing Chris Volstad in their starting rotation. Maya pitched to a 2-4 record and a 4.86 ERA in 11 games started for the Bears, who brought him back for the 2015 season. On April 9, 2015, Maya no-hit the Nexen Heroes at home in a 1-0 victory, the 12th no-hitter in the 33-year history of the KBO. He threw 136 pitches and struck out 8 batters in his effort. On June 16, 2015, Maya was released by the Bears after the team signed Anthony Swarzak. He had struggled to a 8.17 ERA since hurling his no-hitter.

Los Angeles Angels
On February 2, 2016, Maya signed a minor league contract with the Los Angeles Angels. Maya spent the season with the Triple-A Salt Lake Bees before electing free agency on November 7, 2016.

Rieleros De Aguascalientes
On June 18, 2018, Maya signed with the Rieleros de Aguascalientes of the Mexican League. He was released on August 1, 2018. He made 4 starts and went 1-1 with a 7.13 ERA and 8 strikeouts in 17.2 innings.

Saraperos de Saltillo
On March 1, 2019, Maya signed with the Saraperos de Saltillo of the Mexican League. He was released on April 13, 2019 after making 2 starts going 0-1 with a 15.63 ERA and 4 strikeouts in 6.1 innings.

After the 2020 season, he played for Águilas Cibaeñas of the Dominican Professional Baseball League(LIDOM). He has also played for Dominican Republic in the 2021 Caribbean Series.

Diablos Rojos del México
On December 14, 2022, Maya signed with the Diablos Rojos del México of the Mexican Baseball League.

See also

List of baseball players who defected from Cuba

References

External links

Career statistics and player information from Korea Baseball Organization

1981 births
Living people
Águilas Cibaeñas players
Cuban expatriate baseball players in the Dominican Republic
Baseball players at the 2007 Pan American Games
Central American and Caribbean Games gold medalists for Cuba
Central American and Caribbean Games medalists in baseball
Competitors at the 2006 Central American and Caribbean Games
Defecting Cuban baseball players
Doosan Bears players
Cuban expatriate baseball players in South Korea
Gulf Coast Nationals players
Gwinnett Braves players
KBO League pitchers
Major League Baseball players from Cuba
Cuban expatriate baseball players in the United States
Medalists at the 2007 Pan American Games
Mexican League baseball pitchers
National baseball team players
Pan American Games gold medalists for Cuba
Pan American Games medalists in baseball
People from Pinar del Río
Potomac Nationals players
Rieleros de Aguascalientes players
Salt Lake Bees players
Saraperos de Saltillo players
Syracuse Chiefs players
Washington Nationals players
2006 World Baseball Classic players
2009 World Baseball Classic players